Phtheochroa drenowskyi is a species of moth of the family Tortricidae. It is found in Albania, Bulgaria and Italy.

The wingspan is 15–16 mm. Adults have been recorded on wing in July.

References

Moths described in 1916
Phtheochroa